Bala Nagamma is a 1942 Telugu-language film directed by C. Pullayya and produced by S. S. Vasan. The story Bala Nagamma was one of the most popular Burrakathas. It was one of the successful early films made by Gemini Studios in Telugu which was not remade in Tamil. Gemini Studios remade the film in Hindi starring Madhubala titled Bahut Din Huwe (1954). The film was later remade in 1959 with same name under the direction of Vedantam Raghavayya.

Plot
The story is about Bala Nagamma, a young princess. The queen Bhulakshmi of King Navabhojaraju prays Jatangi Muni for progeny and is blessed with seven children; the youngest of them is named Bala Nagamma (Kanchanamala). She is married off to Karyavardi Raju (Banda). She is kidnapped by Mayala Marathi (Govindarajula Subbarao), who turns her into a dog and takes her to his cave at Nagullapudi Gattu. Once there, he tries to take advantage of her. She keeps him away by quoting some Vratam (Holy Rites) and Pujas that she is involved in. She is a prisoner in the cave for fourteen years, during which time the Fakir's mistress, Sangu (Pushpavalli), becomes jealous. In the meantime, her son Balavardi Raju grows up and discovers the truth about his mother that she is at Nagallapudi gattu under captive of Mayala Fakir. He seeks the Fakir out through flower-seller woman Tambali peddi by posing as her grandson. Then, he defeats the Fakir.

Cast

Male cast
Dr. Govindarajula Subba Rao as Mayala Marathi
Banda Kanaka Lingeswara Rao  as Karyavardhi Raju
Balijepalli Lakshmikantha Kavi as Navabhoja Raju
Master Viswam as Balavardhi Raju
Podila Venkata Krishnamurthy as Ramavardhi Raju
Relangi Venkatramaiah as Kotwal Rama Singh
Lanka Satyam as Chakali Tippudu
V. Lakshmikantham as Astrologer 
Addala Narayana Rao as Nagendrudu
Karra Suryanarayana as Puli Raju

Female cast
Kanchanamala as Balanagamma
Pushpavalli as Rani Sangu
Bellary Lalitha as Bhulakshmi
Kamala Devi as Mandula Manikyam
Seetabayamma as Durga
Ratnamala as Seetali (Chakali Tippudu’s Wife)
Anjani Bai as Tambali Peddi
Saraswati as Young Balanagamma
Kamala as Young Suryanagamma
Kamalakumari as Dasi

Soundtrack
There are three songs in the film.
"Naa Sogase Kani Marude Dasudu Kada" – Pushpavalli
"Nanna Memu Delhi Potham"
"Sri Jaya Jaya Gowri Ramana" – Bellary Lalitha

Reception

References

External links

Balanagamma at Cinegoer.com
Watch BalaNagama At Basthi.com
Bala Nagamma at The Hindu/Cinema Plus
List of Copyright violators reported

1940s Telugu-language films
Gemini Studios films
Indian fantasy films
Films based on Indian folklore
Telugu films remade in other languages
1940s fantasy films
Indian black-and-white films
Films directed by C. Pullayya